Gaël Germany (born 10 May 1983 in Sainte-Marie) is a Martiniquais international footballer who currently plays for Samaritaine as a midfielder.

Career
The defender began his career for Samaritaine Sainte-Marie and joined in December 2007 to Arles-Avignon.

International goals
Scores and results list Martinique's goal tally first.

References

External links
 
 

1983 births
Living people
French footballers
Association football defenders
AC Arlésien players
Paris FC players
Ligue 2 players
Ligue 1 players
Martiniquais footballers
Martinique international footballers
2013 CONCACAF Gold Cup players
2014 Caribbean Cup players
Association football midfielders